Delta Spirit is an American rock band from California, United States. The group consists of Jonathan Jameson (bass), Brandon Young (drums), Matthew Vasquez (vocals and guitars), Kelly Winrich (multi-instrumentalist), and William McLaren (guitar).

History
Founded in San Diego in 2005, Jameson and Young, who had played with each other in many bands, decided to form a band with their new friend Matthew Logan Vasquez. Young first spotted Vasquez busking on a bench in San Diego at two in the morning, and the two exchanged information. Delta Spirit recorded their I Think I've Found It EP at Winrich's home studio, and he joined the band within the first year. Winrich and Vasquez had been close friends since they were 18 years old. The EP was later released by Monarchy Music on CD and 12" Vinyl in 2006.

The band produced and recorded their debut album, Ode to Sunshine, in a cabin in Julian, CA and released it independently in late 2007. Ode to Sunshine was re-released with new artwork (featuring Winrich's great-uncle Dr. Thomas Payne on the cover) and a new version of the song "Streetwalker" on August 26, 2008, by Rounder Records. The band has made numerous television appearances, including Late Night with Conan O'Brien in late 2008 and Last Call with Carson Daly in March 2009.

Walker left the band in the fall of 2009. Their second album, History From Below, was released on June 8, 2010. The album's title was inspired by the historian and author Howard Zinn. Many of the songs were composed on an acoustic guitar in hotel rooms as the band toured 293 dates in 2009. On November 15, 2010, Delta Spirit performed a live set for "Guitar Center Sessions" on DirecTV. The episode included an interview with program host, Nic Harcourt. In 2010–2011, the band also performed on Jimmy Kimmel Live!, Last Call with Carson Daly, and Jools Holland. That same year Delta Spirit did 2 US tours and one European Tour. In 2011, William McLaren became a full member of Delta Spirit. McLaren formerly played in The Willowz and Cults. In April 2011, Delta Spirit played in the Coachella Valley Music and Arts Festival in Indio, California.
In the Summer of 2011, they rented a rehearsal studio in San Pedro, CA used by Cold War Kids and Murder City Devils in order to write what would become their third record, "Delta Spirit". In July, they traveled to West Hurley, NY to refine and record that material at Dreamland with producer Chris Coady (Beach House, TV On the Radio).
In the fall of 2011, Delta Spirit opened for My Morning Jacket. On March 13, 2012 they released their third studio album, self-titled Delta Spirit. On August 4, 2012, the band performed at Lollapalooza in Chicago, IL.
In 2013 the band relocated to Brooklyn, New York.

The Delta Spirit song "Devil Knows You're Dead" was used in the final scene of the 5th and final season of Friday Night Lights. The song "People, Turn Around", was also used in the final scene of the Season 2 Sons of Anarchy episode "Potlatch". Their song "Salt in the Wound" from their 2008 album History from Below appeared in the Grey's Anatomy episode "With You I'm Born Again". The song "9/11" was used in the final scene of the Season 2 My Life As Liz episode 5. The song "People C'mon" was used in The Big C episode "Blue Eyed Iris" and in UFC Primetime: Velasquez vs. Dos Santos. The song "Running" is featured on "The Walking Dead" Original Soundtrack – Vol. 1
The song "Yamaha" was used in the 2013 movie Warm Bodies. The song "California" was used in American Dad! in season 10, episode 06.

In 2014, the band switched to Dualtone Records and released the album Into the Wide produced by Ben Allen (Animal Collective, Deerhunter, Belle and Sebastian). It is the group's highest-charting album in the United States to date. The band's publicity tour included a performance on Late Show with David Letterman.

In 2019, the band announced a New Year's Eve Show in Austin, Texas, and then later announced the Not Dead Yet tour for 2020.

Members

Current
Matthew Vasquez – lead vocals, guitar, piano (2005–present)
Kelly Winrich – producer, engineer, piano, organ, synthesizer, guitar, bass, drums, vocals (2005–present)
William McLaren – guitar, vocals (2011–present)
Jonathan Jameson – bass guitar 2005–present)
Brandon Young – drums (2005–present)

Former
Sean Walker – (2005–2009)

Discography

Albums

EPs

Singles

Notes

References

External links

 UK label site
 Interview with bassist Jon Jameson about second album History From Below
 Interview with Delta Spirit from Chicago
 Crawdaddy! review of Ode to Sunshine, August 27, 2008
 Interview with Jon Jameson on TheWaster.com

Indie rock musical groups from California
Musical groups from San Diego
Musical groups established in 2005
Dualtone Records artists